John Wagner Leglue (born April 17, 1996) is an American football guard and offensive tackle for the Tennessee Titans of the National Football League (NFL). He played college football at Tulane.

College career
Leglue played four years at Tulane where he played in 49 games and made 38 starts, opening games at four different positions throughout the offensive line. As a senior, he started all 13 games at right guard, blocking for an offense that ranked No. 5 in the AAC in rushing and later got his only career bowl game against Louisiana in the AutoNation Cure Bowl, where they obtained a 41–24 win.

Professional career

Denver Broncos
After his college stint, Leglue was signed by the Denver Broncos as an undrafted free agent on April 30, 2019. However, he was waived on August 31.

New Orleans Saints
On September 1, 2019, Leglue was signed by the New Orleans Saints to their practice squad, where he spent most of the season.

Green Bay Packers
On December 21, 2019, the Green Bay Packers signed Leglue from the Saints' practice squad spending the last two weeks of the season inactive. He later spent the next offseason with the Packers, eventually being waived on September 5, 2020.

Pittsburgh Steelers
On December 29, 2020, the Pittsburgh Steelers signed Leglue to their practice squad, where he spent the rest of the season.

On January 14, 2021, the Steelers signed Leglue to a reserve/future contract. However, they waived him on August 31 and added him to the practice squad the next day. On November 27, the Steelers signed Leglue to the 53-man roster after a rash of injuries to the offensive line. He made his NFL debut in relief of B. J. Finney in a win against the Baltimore Ravens on December 5, earning praise from coach Mike Tomlin. Four days later, Leglue made his first start in a loss to the Minnesota Vikings.

On August 30, 2022, Leglue was waived by the Steelers and signed to the practice squad the next day.

Tennessee Titans
On January 17, 2023, Leglue signed a reserve/future contract with the Tennessee Titans.

Personal life
Leglue earned an undergraduate degree in finance in three years and earned an MBA.

References

External links
Tulane Green Wave bio
Pittsburgh Steelers bio

1996 births
Living people
American football offensive guards
American football offensive tackles
Denver Broncos players
Green Bay Packers players
New Orleans Saints players
People from Alexandria, Louisiana
Pittsburgh Steelers players
Tulane Green Wave football players
Players of American football from Louisiana
Sportspeople from Alexandria, Louisiana
Tennessee Titans players